Casio electronic musical keyboards were first manufactured in June 1979 and continue to be made by Casio today. The original Casiotone line was abbreviated to CT in the mid-1980s but has continued to feature full-sized keys. MT and PT lines typically feature mini keys and the VL line features push-button keys. Most Casio keyboards feature automated accompaniment sections which may include drums, bass, chords and harmonies. Many Casio keyboards can be run on both mains electricity and battery power. Some Casio keyboards were integrated into other electronic audio equipment, including AM/FM radios and cassette decks.

This list includes some of the instruments' basic specifications and is not exhaustive. Casio keyboards from the 1980s and 1990s are used by electronic musicians and sound engineers to achieve an authentic lo-fi sound and some modify them by circuit bending to extend their sound palettes.

Casiotone keyboards (1980-present)

Synthesizers (1984-1988)

K Series (kids keyboards)

LK Series (light keyboards with illuminated keys)

M Series (mini keyboards)

P Series (petite keyboards)

S Series (sampler keyboards)

T Series (tape keyboards)

VL Series (button keyboards)

Other

References

External links 

 Models and production of CASIO keyboards instruments 
 Casio Home Keyboards | Sound Programming
 Past Models | Electronic Musical Instruments - Casio
 History of CASIO's Musical Instrument Business

Casio musical instruments